The 2021–22 Oregon Ducks women's basketball team represented the University of Oregon during the 2021–22 NCAA Division I women's basketball season. The Ducks were led by eighth-year head coach Kelly Graves, and they played their home games at Matthew Knight Arena as members of the Pac-12 Conference.

Previous season 

The Ducks finished the season at 15–9 and 10–7 in Pac-12 play to finish in fourth place. They received a bye in the Pac-12 Tournament and lost in their first game to their rivals, Oregon State. The Ducks received a bid to the NCAA tournament. They defeated South Dakota and Georgia in the first and second rounds before losing to Louisville in the Sweet Sixteen.

Offseason

Departures
Due to COVID-19 disruptions throughout NCAA sports in 2020–21, the NCAA announced that the 2020–21 season would not count against the athletic eligibility of any individual involved in an NCAA winter sport, including women's basketball. This meant that all seniors in 2020–21 had the option to return for 2021–22.

Incoming transfers

Roster

Schedule

|-
!colspan=9 style=| Exhibition

|-
!colspan=9 style=| Regular Season

|-
!colspan=9 style=|Pac-12 Women's Tournament

|-
!colspan=9 style=|NCAA tournament

Source:

Rankings

*The preseason and week 1 polls were the same.^Coaches did not release a week 2 poll.

See also
 2021–22 Oregon Ducks men's basketball team

Notes

References

Oregon Ducks women's basketball seasons
Oregon
Oregon Ducks
Oregon Ducks
Oregon